The little striped whiptail (Aspidoscelis inornatus) is a species of lizard found in the southwestern United States (in Arizona, New Mexico and Texas) and in northern Mexico (in Chihuahua, Coahuila, Durango, Zacatecas, San Luis Potosí, and Nuevo León). A significant amount of research was done on the species during the mid-1990s, with several new subspecies being added, many of which some sources consider to be distinct enough to warrant full species status, and the research is ongoing. It is called little to distinguish it from many other species known as striped whiptails and to indicate that it is the smallest of those species.

Description 
The little striped whiptail grows from 6.5 to 9.5 inches in length. It is typically black in color, with yellow or white striping from head to tail, and a light blue underside. It is slender bodied, with a blue colored tail approximately three times the body length. The blue coloration is much more pronounced on males than females. They aren't always striped or blue, sometimes they are brown with darker patches to blend in with the sand or dirt.

Behavior 
Like most species of whiptail lizard, the little striped whiptail is diurnal and insectivorous. They are wary, energetic, and fast moving, darting for cover if approached. They are found in a range of habitats, from grasslands to semi-arid rocky slopes. Breeding takes place in the late spring, and clutches of 2 to 4 eggs are laid from May to July and hatch approximately six weeks later. The whiptail species eat crickets and other insects that live in Arizona. They are very fast in speed and quick to dive under a cactus if necessary.

Subspecies 
There are eight recognized subspecies of Cnemidophorus inornatus:

Aspidoscelis inornatus chihuahuae (Wright & Lowe, 1993)
Aspidoscelis inornatus cienegae (Wright & Lowe, 1993)
Aspidoscelis inornatus heptagrammus (Axtell, 1961) - Trans-Pecos striped whiptail
Aspidoscelis inornatus juniperus (Wright & Lowe, 1993) - woodland striped whiptail
Aspidoscelis inornatus llanuras (Wright & Lowe, 1993)
Aspidoscelis inornatus inornatus (Baird, 1859)
Aspidoscelis inornatus octolineatus (Baird, 1858)
Aspidoscelis inornatus paululus (Williams, 1968)

References 

Notes

Herps of Texas: Cnemidophorus inornatus heptagrammus

Aspidoscelis
Fauna of the Southwestern United States
Fauna of Northeastern Mexico
Reptiles of the United States
Reptiles of Mexico
Reptiles described in 1859
Taxa named by Spencer Fullerton Baird